Joseph France may refer to:

 Joseph I. France (1873–1939), U.S. senator from Maryland
 Joseph Nathaniel France (1907–1997), Saint Kitts and Nevis politician and trade union leader
 Joseph La France (1707–1745), Métis fur trader in Canada